Hoffmans, also known as Hoffman's Crossing, is an unincorporated community located along Hoffman's Crossing Road and the South Branch Raritan River within Lebanon Township in Hunterdon County, New Jersey. The main road in the community is County Route 513 (High Bridge-Califon Road). The Hunterdon County Educational Services Commission (HCESC) has a campus here.

History
The community is named after Issac H. Hoffman (1862–1959), a local farmer, banker and businessman, who operated a sawmill and peach basket factory here.

In 1876, the High Bridge Branch of the Central Railroad of New Jersey (CNJ) starts operation through the community.

Points of interest
The Columbia Trail passes through the community and connects to the nearby Ken Lockwood Gorge.

The Hoffman's Crossing Road Bridge, a Pratt thru truss bridge built in 1898, was added to the New Jersey Register of Historic Places on February 11, 1999.

The Hunterdon Art Museum offers Earth Based Arts and Nature-Themed Programs at the Hoffman's Crossing Campus of HCESC.

References

External links
 

Lebanon Township, New Jersey
Unincorporated communities in Hunterdon County, New Jersey
Unincorporated communities in New Jersey